Steve Gray (18 April 1944 – 20 September 2008) was a British pianist, composer and arranger.

Biography
Gray was born in Middlesbrough, England. At the age of 10, he began teaching himself to play the piano. He joined the Middlesbrough Junior Orchestra, at first playing the bassoon but later switching to the saxophone. The orchestra was directed by Ron Aspery, who would go on to create the fusion group Back Door.

During the 1970s he played sessions for Quincy Jones, Henry Mancini, Michel Legrand, Lalo Schifrin, Peggy Lee, Sammy Davis Jr and John Barry.

Gray joined John Williams' band Sky in 1981, replacing Francis Monkman on keyboards, a role he continued until Sky's final live concerts in 1995.

Gray was also a respected composer of concert works. These include two operas, a Requiem Mass for jazz big band and choir, a guitar concerto written for John Williams and the London Symphony Orchestra (1988), and a piano concerto written for French jazz pianist Martial Solal. He also provided a full orchestration of the works of Brian Eno (in collaboration with the original composer). From 1991, he worked closely with the North German Radio (NDR) Big Band in Hamburg (at the invitation of singer and composer Norma Winstone) and from 1998 he worked as guest professor of composition and arrangement in the jazz institute of Berlin's Hochschule für Musik Hanns Eisler also composing and orchestrating the albums Update, You're Everything for the Berlin Jazz Orchestra. The WDR Rundfunkorchester Köln posthumously released the CD Europhonia in 2014 which is a 2003 live recording of Gray's music written for the group. Gray is the conductor and musical director for this release.  

Gray also composed production music for such labels as Amphonic, KPM and Bruton. Among his compositions is the song "Great Ovation", the opening fanfare of which was used for the Walt Disney Home Video "Feature Presentation" bumpers from 1989 to 1999. "Great Ovation" was also featured in the Bruton Music album Televisual which was released in 1984.

References 

1944 births
2008 deaths
People from Middlesbrough
20th-century English musicians
British composers
British film score composers
British television composers
English film score composers
English male film score composers
English television composers
English male composers
Sky (English/Australian band) members
20th-century British male musicians